The Shakey's V-League 11th Season: Reinforced Open Conference was the 21st conference of Shakey's V-League which began on October 5, 2014.

The Cagayan Valley Lady Rising Suns beat the Philippine Army Lady Troopers in two games. In the inaugural men's division, Instituto Estetico Manila Phoenix Volley Masters defeated Systema Active Smashers in 3 games.

Tournament format

Preliminaries
Four (4) competing teams in both men's and women's division in a double round robin format.

Finals
Rank 1 team battles Rank 2 team for GOLD, and Rank 3 team battles Rank 4 team for BRONZE.  The battle for GOLD and the battle for BRONZE will both follow the best-of-three format, provided: If the battle for GOLD ends in two (2) matches (2-0), then there will no longer be Game 3 for either GOLD or BRONZE. If, in the case, the series for BRONZE is tied (1-1), then the tie will be resolved using FIVB rules. A tie in the series for GOLD (1-1) after Game 2 will be broken in a Game 3, regardless of the results of the series in BRONZE.

Exhibition Match

Line up

Matches

|}

Women's Division

Participating Teams

Season's Line-Up

Preliminaries

Finals

Battle for Bronze

Battle for Gold

Final standings

Men's Division

Participating Teams

Season's Line-Up

Preliminaries

Finals

Battle for Bronze

Battle for Gold

Final standings

Individual awards

References

External links
 www.v-league.ph - Official website

Shakey's V-League conferences